Ciudad de las Ideas (City of Ideas) is an album released by Spanish performer Vicente Amigo in 2000. The album earned Amigo a Latin Grammy Award nomination for Album of the Year and won Best Flamenco Album.

Track listing
All tracks written and performed by Vicente Amigo. This information adapted from Allmusic.

 The nomination was shared with Boris Alarcón, Antonio Algarrada, Oscar Clavel and Nigel Walker (engineers/mixers).

References

2000 albums
Vicente Amigo albums
Latin Grammy Award for Best Flamenco Album